Premier Sports is a 24-hour Philippine pay television channel dedicated to sporting events owned by TAP Digital Media Ventures Corporation. It serves as a "secondary" sports channel of TAP Sports.

It made its official launch on October 1, 2021, as a direct response to the closure of the Fox Sports channels for the said region.

Sister channels

Premier Football
Premier Football is a dedicated football (soccer) channel. It broadcasts selected coverages of international football leagues. It was launched on February 17, 2020.

Premier Sports 2
Premier Sports 2 is a second sports channel under the Premier brand. It primarily broadcasts WTA tennis and PGA Tour golf tournaments, as well as rugby and athletics.

It was launched on February 17, 2020, as Premier Tennis, which broadcasts all of the ATP and WTA tournaments throughout the year.

Programming and coverage rights

American football
 NFL

Athletics
 Wanda Diamond League

Autoracing
 Formula One
 NASCAR (highlights show)

Golf
 LPGA
 PGA Tour

Mixed martial arts and Boxing
 Cage Warriors
 UFC
 UFC Classics
 UFC Fight Night events
 UFC Reloaded
 UFC Submissions
 Dana White's Contender Series
 Superbouts boxing events

Rugby union
 World Rugby Sevens Series

Snooker
 British Open

Soccer (association football)
 DFB-Pokal
 Eredivisie
 Chinese Super League
 K League 1 
 Canadian Premier League
 UEFA
 UEFA Champions League
 UEFA Europa League
 UEFA Nations League
 UEFA Super Cup
 UEFA Weekly Magazine
Bundesliga
Saudi Professional League
FIFA

Tennis
 WTA
 WTA 250
 WTA 500
 WTA 1000
 WTA Finals

Volleyball
 FIVB Volleyball Men's Nations League
 FIVB Volleyball Women's Nations League

Wrestling
 All Elite Wrestling
 AEW Dynamite
 AEW Rampage
 AEW pay-per-view events

Non-sports programming
Golf Academy
School of Golf
 Trans World Sport

Previous broadcasting rights
 Premier League (2020–2022)
 Scottish Professional Football League (2020–2022)

See also
 TAP Sports
 Fox Sports Asia
 Solar Sports
 One Sports
 BeIN Sports
 SPOTV

References

Sports television networks in the Philippines
English-language television stations in the Philippines
Television channels and stations established in 2021
Sports television in the Philippines
Television networks in the Philippines
2021 establishments in the Philippines
TAP Digital Media Ventures Corporation